Joseph Ezekiel Rajpurkar (1834–1905) was a Bene Israel writer and translator of Hebrew liturgical works into Marathi.

Biography
Joseph Ezekiel Rajpurkar was born to a prominent Bene Israel family in Bombay in 1834. His father, Ezekiel Joseph Rajpurkar, was a teacher and superintendent of Scottish mission schools. Rajpurkar was educated in the school of the Free General Assembly by John Wilson, where he studied Hebrew, English, and other subjects. He became an assistant teacher at the David Sassoon Benevolent Institution—a school for Baghdadi Jewish children—in 1856. He was appointed headmaster five years later, a position he kept for forty years. In 1871 Rajpurkar was appointed examiner in Hebrew at the University of Bombay, and in 1879 was made a fellow of the university. He became justice of the peace in 1890.

Rajpurkar translated over twenty works of the Hebrew liturgy and many English works of Jewish interest into Marathi, and authored expositions on rabbinic literature and Jewish history. His translations include the siddur, maḥzor, piyyutim, and seliḥot, among others. In 1876 he published Israelache Dharmamattavishaye Shastrateel Pramane, a defence of Judaism's legitimacy, in an effort to avert Bene Israel from converting to Christianity. He also published Kuttonet Yosef, a handbook of Hebrew abbreviations, a Hebrew grammar in Marathi, and a Hebrew primer for children.

Aside from his work as teacher, translator, and commentator, Rajpurkar worked unceasingly for the good of the Jews in Bombay. He spearheaded Bombay Jewry's response to the blood libel charge that appeared in 1882 in the Bombay Cassid, a Gujarati-language Muslim periodical, and for many years served as Senior Warden of the Shaar ha-Raḥamim Synagogue and Secretary to the Israel Lokancha Sudronshodak Mandali (Bene Israel Improvement Society).

External links

 Works of Joseph Ezekiel Rajpurkar at the Internet Archive

References
 

1834 births
1905 deaths
19th-century Indian educators
19th-century Jews
Bene Israel
Indian justices of the peace
Indian schoolteachers
Jewish religious writers
Jewish translators
Marathi-language writers
Heads of schools in India
Translators from Hebrew
Translators to Marathi
Writers from Mumbai
19th-century translators